Bokoto (Ɓòzôm, Gbaya-Bozoum) is a Gbaya language of the Central African Republic. Ethnologue reports it may be mutually intelligible with Gbaya-Bossangoa.

References

Gbaya languages
Languages of the Central African Republic